Thomas Paul Farrell (21 September 1893 – 12 June 1975) was an Irish film and television actor.

He is best remembered as the "Tramp" who gets beaten up by Alex and his "droogs", in Stanley Kubrick's A Clockwork Orange (1971).

Filmography

References

External links
 

1893 births
1975 deaths
Irish male television actors
Irish male film actors
Male actors from Dublin (city)
20th-century Irish male actors